Lachlan McPherson (born 11 July 1900) was a Scottish footballer who played as a left half or inside left.

Career
Raised in the Springburn area of Glasgow, McPherson began his career as a teenager with Cambuslang Rangers in the Scottish junior leagues before moving south to English football; he never played for a senior Scottish club.

His longest spell was at Swansea Town where he spent five seasons, made 199 Football League appearances and helped the club to win the Third Division South and gain promotion in 1924–25, followed by a run to the semi-finals of the 1925–26 FA Cup.

Prior to his time at the Swans, McPherson had been with Notts County, playing a part in their Second Division title in 1922–23 – although subsequently he featured only five times in the top tier – and after his time in Wales he won the same medal again in 1930–31 with Everton. He had signed for the Toffees in January 1930 for a substantial £5,000 fee a few days after Swansea teammate Ben Williams made the same move, only for the team to be relegated five months later, recovering their top division status at the first time of asking.

Technically McPherson was still part of the Everton squad as they went straight on to win the First Division in 1931–32, but he only made three appearances in the campaign, and did not play first team football at Goodison Park for almost two years with his cause hampered by a serious knee injury, and interested clubs deterred by the high value placed on his transfer by the club due to a determination to recoup as much as possible of the fee they paid Swansea for his services. Eventually he went to Merseyside neighbours New Brighton in August 1933 for a small fraction of that earlier deal.

He later had a spell as player-manager of  Hereford United, then competing in the semi-professional Birmingham & West Midlands League.

References

1900 births
Year of death unknown
20th-century deaths
Scottish footballers
Footballers from Glasgow
People from Springburn
Scottish football managers
English Football League players
Scottish Junior Football Association players
Association football wing halves
Association football inside forwards
Association football player-managers
Everton F.C. players
Notts County F.C. players
Cambuslang Rangers F.C. players
Swansea City A.F.C. players
New Brighton A.F.C. players
Milford United F.C. players
Hereford United F.C. players
Hereford United F.C. managers